is a railway station of the Chūō Main Line, Central Japan Railway Company in the city of  Shiojiri, Nagano Prefecture, Japan.

Lines

Layout
The station has two ground-level side platforms connected by a footbridge. The station is unattended.

Platforms

Adjacent stations

|-
!colspan=5|

History
Kiso-Hirasawa Station was opened on 5 June 1930.  On 1 April 1987, it became part of JR Tōkai.

Passenger statistics
In fiscal 2015, the station was used by an average of 46 passengers daily (boarding passengers only).

Surrounding area
Hirasawa Post Office

See also
 List of Railway Stations in Japan

References

External links

Railway stations in Japan opened in 1930
Railway stations in Nagano Prefecture
Stations of Central Japan Railway Company
Chūō Main Line
Shiojiri, Nagano